Stridsvagn 122 (Strv 122) (is a Swedish main battle tank based on the German Leopard 2 improved variant, just like the  German Leopard 2A5, utilizing newer technology such as command-, control-, and fire-control systems, as well as reinforced armour and long-term combat capacity. Externally, the vehicle can be distinguished from the Leopard 2A5 by the French GALIX smoke dispensers, different storage bins, and the thicker crew hatches.

Development 
After the Strv 2000 was dismissed, the Swedish government decided in 1991 that a new main battle tank was to be procured to replace the Strv 101/102s and Strv 103s in service at the time. During the project "Strv Ny", three tank models were sent to Sweden to participate in trials: the American M1A2 Abrams, the German Leopard 2 Improved and a prototype variant of the French Leclerc.

The trials concluded with the Leopard 2 Improved as the winner with the M1A2 coming in a close second place. The shortcomings of the Leclerc were partly attributed to it still being in the development phase and not yet mature for service. In 1994 the Swedish government decided to acquire 120 new production tanks and 160 older Leopard 2A4s as a stopgap before the newer tanks were finished. The Leopard 2A4 in Swedish service became designated Strv 121 while the new production became the Strv 122. Of the 120 Strv 122, 29 were manufactured by Krauss-Maffei Wegmann while the other 91 were manufactured by Bofors and Hägglunds.

Features 
The Leopard PT A's width of 3.75 meters has been kept, while the weight increased by only .

The Stridsvagn 122 was designed to fight in Swedish conditions including heavily forested areas as well as urban terrain. The designation derives from the 12 cm gun, on the second tank in Swedish service featuring this calibre (the first being Strv 121, Leopard 2A4s fitted with Swedish lights and radios and painted in Swedish camouflage). Strv 122 also had to overcome the perceived flaws of the original German tank, and features the following abilities:
 Heavily reinforced armour to protect against man-portable anti-tank weapons.
 An advanced CBRN defence system for protection against chemical, biological and radioactive weapons.
 Wading capability to pass through water up to 1.4 meters deep.
 Quick ability to discover, identify and lock on a target with the assistance of a laser rangefinder, thermographic camera, and a speed/distance/accuracy calculator for maximum accuracy.
 Ability to lock onto numerous targets at once, enabling the tank to fight numerous enemy vehicles without having to manually re-aim the gun after every shot.
 Active communication for improved cooperation between units.
 Tank Command & Control System TCCS by Celsius Tech Systems AB.

Production and service 
As of 2013, 42 of these tanks remained in active service. Most of the 160 Leopard 2 A4s (local designation Strv 121) that were originally leased are being returned to Germany. The active tanks are divided between three companies, two at P 4, Skövde and one at I 19, Boden. In 2015, the Swedish government decided that another tank company should be established at the P 18 regiment on the island of Gotland. This company was to be trained at P 4 and transferred to P 18 in 2019. 

In 2016, Sweden ordered new upgrades for the Strv 122 from Krauss-Maffei, with delivery slated to be between 2018 and 2023. Apart from routine renovation, Stridsledningssystem Bataljon (tactical command system battalion from SAAB), a new observation/gun sight (TIM) for the commander, as well as new communication systems for international missions, will be added together with a modular 360° ballistic protection system. This new upgraded version is designated Strv 122C if the vehicle is an upgraded 122A variant or Strv 122D if the upgrade is applied to an Strv 122B.

On 24th February 2023 the Swedish government announced that it would send 10 Strv 122 to the Ukrainian armed forces.

Variants 

 Strv 122A – Baseline variant. Entered service in 1997.
 Strv 122B – Variant with improved mine protection, modification of existing Strv 122A models in 2002.
 Strv 122B Int. – Modified for international deployments in warmer climates. Command & Control Systems were made NATO-compatible. Barracuda camo-nets that dampen infrared signature were applied. 
 Strv 122C – Renovated Strv 122A with updated Command & Control systems by FMV's FSV Mv division and KMW.
 Strv 122D – Renovated Strv 122B with updated Command & Control systems by FMV's FSV Mv division and KMW. 
 Strv 122B+ Evolution – Prototype made by IBD and Åkers Krutbruk Protection AB in 2010. Increased protection levels using more advanced composite materials.

Comparison with other main battle tanks

Operators 
Current operators
 

Future operators
  – On 24 February 2023, the first anniversary of the Russian full-scale invasion, Minister of Defence Pål Jonson announced the donation of 10 Leopard 2A5 tanks (presumably Strv 122) to Ukraine, along with Hawk and IRIS-T air defense systems and CV90 infantry fighting vehicles.

Notes

References

Bibliography

External links 

 Stridsvagn 122 – Strv122

Main battle tanks of Sweden
Military vehicles introduced in the 1990s